St. Faith and St. Laurence's Church, Harborne is a parish church in the Church of England in Harborne, Birmingham. It is part of the Anglican Diocese of Birmingham, and a member of Inclusive Church.

History

St. Faith and St. Laurence's Church was designed by the architect P. B. Chatwin and work started in 1937. Building work was interrupted by the outbreak of the Second World War and the building was completed in 1960.

List of Vicars
1937-1960 W.G. Sissons
1960-1968 Roger Price
1968-1988 John Rossington
1988-2003 Ian Michael
2005– 2022 Priscilla White

Organ

A specification of the organ can be found on the National Pipe Organ Register.

References

Harborne
Churches completed in 1960
20th-century Church of England church buildings